Han, formerly Hanköy and Hüsrevpaşa, is a town and district of Eskişehir Province in the Central Anatolia region of Turkey. According to a 2010 census, population of the district is 2,165 of which 1,057 live in the town of Han.

Notes

References

External links
 District governor's official website 
 Map of Han district

Towns in Turkey
Populated places in Eskişehir Province
Districts of Eskişehir Province